The A697 is a road that can be used an alternative to the A1 for those travelling between Scotland and England via the North East.

Route
It connects Morpeth on the A1 to the A68 at Oxton, near Edinburgh. The road runs via Wooler and Coldstream, and passes through a largely rural area of the Scottish Borders.

Devil's Causeway
Stretches of the route overlay the Devil's Causeway, a Roman road.

Speed
The A697 is around  shorter and an average time of 23 minutes quicker than travelling up the A1, according to figures from the RAC route planner.

Settlements on route
The road runs through
Morpeth
Espley
Longhorsley
Weldon
Longframlington
Thrunton
Powburn
Wooperton
Haugh Head
Wooler
Low Humbleton
Akeld
Milfield
Crookham
Cornhill on Tweed
Coldstream
Orange Lane
Greenlaw
Houndslow
Thirlestane
Oxton

References

Roads in England
Roads in Scotland
Transport in Northumberland
Transport in the Scottish Borders
Roads in Northumberland